Charles Gordon Stewart Mackie was a Scottish businessman in Hong Kong and member of the Legislative Council and Executive Council of Hong Kong.

Biography
C. Gordon Mackie was associated with China and Hong Kong and head of many public utilities companies. He was the head of the two big local firms, Mackinnon, Mackenzie & Co., the shipping company and managing director of the Gibb, Livingston & Co., agent for the public utility company Hong Kong Electric Company. He had also been chairman and deputy chairman of the board of the Hongkong and Shanghai Banking Corporation.

Mackie was made Justice of the Peace and was elected to the Legislative Council as representative of the Justices of the Peace during the absence of Henry Pollock in May and October 1928. In 1931, he was nominated to replace J. Owen Hughes as the representative of the Hong Kong General Chamber of Commerce for a four-year-term from 17 May. He served on the Legislative Council for six years until he retired and returned to Britain in April 1935. Tribute was paid by Governor William Peel upon his leave.

He was appointed to the Executive Council on several occasions, in June 1930 and in April 1933 during W. E. L. Shenton's absence, April 1931 in the place of J. Owen Hughes during Henry Pollock's on leave, and again in May 1934 for Henry Pollock. 

Among others he was also the member of the Authorized Architects' Committee and Harbour Advisory Committee.

He was the chairman of the Stewards of the Hong Kong Jockey Club. On his trip to Macao for the Spring Race Meeting of the Macau Jockey Club in March 1932, the ship he toke, Venezia, crashed with Sui Tai which was on its way to Hong Kong near Lantau Island. Mackie and his wife were the survivors in the collision.

His daughter Jean Mackie was a keen lady flier and was the first lady and also first member of the Hong Kong Flying Club to receive a "A" flying certificate in June 1934.

References

Scottish businesspeople
Hong Kong businesspeople
Hong Kong people of Scottish descent
Scottish expatriates in Hong Kong
Members of the Executive Council of Hong Kong
Members of the Legislative Council of Hong Kong
Chairmen of HSBC
Year of birth missing
Year of death missing